Kathleen Hartington Kennedy Townsend (born July 4, 1951) is an American attorney who was the sixth Lieutenant Governor of Maryland from 1995 to 2003. She ran unsuccessfully for Governor of Maryland in 2002. She was the first female lieutenant governor of Maryland.

In 2010, Townsend became the chair of the non-profit American Bridge, an organization whose focus is to raise funds for Democratic candidates and causes. Since 2021, she has served in the United States Department of Labor as an advisor on retirement. She is a member of the prominent political Kennedy family.

Early life and education
She was born at Greenwich Hospital in Greenwich, Connecticut, the eldest of Robert F. Kennedy and Ethel Skakel's eleven children. She is the eldest grandchild of Joseph P. Kennedy Sr. and Rose Kennedy. While she was growing up, it was not assumed that the girls in the politically oriented Kennedy family would run for office. However, after her uncle President John F. Kennedy was assassinated, her father wrote her saying, "As the oldest of the next generation you have a particular responsibility. ... Be kind to others and work for your country." Her family gave her the nicknames "Clean Kathleen", "the Nun", and "the Un-Kennedy".

Over the summer of 1964, Kennedy won four blue ribbons for her "excellence in horsemanship".
On August 29, 1965, the fourteen-year-old Kennedy was somersaulted by her horse while competing at Sea Flash Farms in West Barnstable, Massachusetts. She was left unconscious and bleeding internally and was rushed to Cape Cod Hospital, located fifteen miles away. Her family was en route to Hyannis Port at the time of the incident and was not located for another three hours.
She was sixteen when her father was assassinated. The night he was shot at the Ambassador Hotel, Kennedy and her two eldest brothers, Joseph II and Robert, Jr., were being flown to Los Angeles aboard one of the jets in the Secret Service's presidential fleet named "the Jet Star". 

She spent most of her childhood in McLean, Virginia, and attended Stone Ridge School in nearby Bethesda, Maryland. She graduated from The Putney School in Vermont. She attended Radcliffe College, receiving her bachelor's degree in history and literature in 1974. She then studied at the University of New Mexico School of Law, receiving her Juris Doctor degree in 1978.

Early career 
After graduation, she worked as an attorney at a law firm in New Haven, Connecticut, while her husband, David Townsend, attended Yale Law School. She also worked on her uncle Ted Kennedy's 1980 presidential campaign, stumped for local Democrats, and was hired as a policy analyst for Massachusetts governor Michael Dukakis in the early 1980s while she and her husband resided in Weston, Massachusetts.

The family moved to Maryland, her husband's home state, in 1984. In 1986, Townsend became the first Kennedy to lose a general election when she ran for the U.S. House of Representatives in Maryland's strongly Republican second congressional district, using the name Townsend only. Incumbent Republican Helen Delich Bentley defeated her 59% to 41%.

She then went to work for the state government of Maryland, holding numerous posts including assistant Attorney General.

Lieutenant Governor of Maryland

1994 election 

In 1994, Parris Glendening was running for Governor in a highly contested primary against then-Lt. Governor Melvin Steinberg when he selected her as his running mate. Experts did not believe she would be an asset, but her name recognition (she now used the name Kennedy Townsend) and her fund-raising skills, helped him to win.

In the general election, Glendening and Townsend beat Republican candidate Ellen Sauerbrey in one of Maryland's closest and most controversial gubernatorial elections. After unofficial results indicated that Sauerbrey had lost the election by a narrow margin, she began making what The Washington Post called "sensational charges" that the election had been stolen. Sauerbrey's allegations included ballot box stuffing, 100% voting in one precinct, voting by numerous dead people, and what she called the Kennedy "precedent"—that unproven rumors that John Kennedy had stolen the 1960 Presidential election proved that his niece Townsend had stolen this election.

The official vote tally declared Glendening the winner by 5,993 votes out of 1.4 million. Sauerbrey hired an election specialist known for aggressive tactics then filed a lawsuit alleging that 50,000 votes had been cast illegally. By the time the hearing began in January 1995, however, Sauerbrey had backed away from the fraud charges and her claim centered on sloppy election procedures and 3,600 challenged ballots. The number of challenged ballots would not have been enough to change the result even if all of them were thrown out. The judge ruled that about 1,800 votes had been cast in Baltimore by people whose names should have been purged from the rolls, but said that there was no clear and convincing evidence that fraud or procedural errors had affected the outcome. Sauerbrey dropped the suit three days before Glendening was to be inaugurated, but still maintained her belief that she had won the election.

Sauerbrey ran against Glendening again in 1998, but this time Glendening and Townsend won by a much wider margin (55% to 44%).

Tenure 
During her tenure as lieutenant governor, Townsend focused on reducing crime and promoting economic development. As lieutenant governor, Townsend travelled to Iowa to campaign for Al Gore in the 2000 presidential election. While she was there, then-Governor Tom Vilsack proclaimed "she has a legitimate shot to be the first woman president of the United States.''

2002 gubernatorial election
In the Maryland gubernatorial election of 2002, Townsend faced Republican Bob Ehrlich and Libertarian Spear Lancaster in the general election.

During the campaign, Townsend was criticized for her choice of running mate, Admiral Charles R. Larson, a novice politician who had switched parties only a few weeks before. Some also criticized the choice of a white male as unlikely to help minority turnout. Ehrlich's running mate was Michael Steele, an African-American lawyer who had been chairman of the Republican Party of Maryland.

Though Maryland traditionally votes Democratic and had not elected a Republican Governor in almost 40 years, Townsend lost the race, gaining 48% of the vote to Ehrlich's 51% and Lancaster's 1%. Ehrlich became only the seventh Republican governor in state history. In the end, most observers agreed she ran a weak campaign. They specifically cited a lack of planning, claiming that she hastily booked campaign stops in rural areas hostile to her. The Baltimore Sun said the defeat derailed her political career, at least in the short run.

Post political career
Townsend, along with siblings Robert, Jr. and Kerry, endorsed Hillary Clinton for president in the 2008 Democratic primaries.

Townsend wrote the book Failing America's Faithful: How Today's Churches Are Mixing God with Politics and Losing Their Way, published in 2007. She also contributes to The Recovering Politician, a website started by Jonathan Miller.

She is an adjunct professor at the Georgetown Public Policy Institute, a visiting fellow at Harvard Kennedy School at Harvard University, and senior Nitze fellow at St. Mary's College of Maryland.

In December 2010, she was appointed chair of American Bridge, a new non-profit that would raise funds for Democratic candidates and causes, and that was intended to be a Democratic counterpart to right-leaning organizations such as American Crossroads and Crossroads GPS. She noted that the Democrats did not have such an organization during the 2010 election cycle, and that Republicans outspent the Democrats by $70 million. "I want to compete dollar to a dollar with the Republicans and I want to beat them", she said.

Personal life
In 1973, she married David Lee Townsend (b. 1947), whom she had met when he was a graduate student and her tutor at Radcliffe. As of April 2020, David is a member of the faculty at St. John's College in Annapolis. The couple have four daughters:

 Meaghan Anne Kennedy Townsend (November 7, 1977)
 Maeve Fahey Kennedy Townsend (November 1, 1979 – April 2, 2020)
 Rose Katherine "Kat" Kennedy Townsend (December 17, 1983)
 Kerry Sophia Kennedy Townsend (November 30, 1991)

On June 27, 2011, her daughter Maeve gave birth to a son named Gideon Joseph Kennedy McKean. Gideon was the first great-grandchild for Bobby and Ethel, as well as the first of the fifth generation of Kennedys.

Maeve and son Gideon went missing, and were presumed dead, in a canoeing accident that occurred on April 2, 2020. After 26 hours the recovery mission was suspended. Maeve's body was found in the Chesapeake Bay on April 6 and Gideon's body was recovered April 8. His body was 2,000 feet from where his mother's was found.

Boards
She has served on the boards of many organizations, and as a consultant to several corporations. She is the chair of the Institute for Human Virology at the University of Maryland. She is on the boards of directors of the John F. Kennedy Library Foundation, the Points of Light Foundation, the Center for American Progress and Catholic Democrats. She was formerly on the independent Advisory Council of the Association of Community Organizations for Reform Now (ACORN), a panel that was appointed to review the functioning of ACORN following the scandal touched off by hidden camera videos in September 2009, and the board of the National Catholic Reporter. Townsend is also a member of the Council on Foreign Relations and the Inter-American Dialogue. She is also on the Board of Selectors of Jefferson Awards for Public Service. She is on the board of directors at the Lightbridge nuclear fuel technology company.

Electoral history

See also
 Kennedy family tree
 List of female lieutenant governors in the United States

References

External links

 
 Summary of Townsend's positions on the issues
 Audio/Video recordings of Kathleen Kennedy Townsend on her book Failing America's Faithful, from the University of Chicago's World Beyond the Headlines series
 Official state government biography
 Congressional Quarterly Voting and Elections Collection
 

|-

1951 births
American people of Dutch descent
American people of Irish descent
Catholics from Connecticut
Catholics from Maryland
American women lawyers
McCourt School of Public Policy faculty
Harvard Kennedy School faculty
Kennedy family
Lieutenant Governors of Maryland
Living people
Maryland Democrats
Maryland lawyers
Connecticut lawyers 
People from Greenwich, Connecticut
Radcliffe College alumni
Robert F. Kennedy
St. Mary's College of Maryland faculty
Schools of the Sacred Heart alumni
The Putney School alumni
United States Department of Justice lawyers
1992 United States presidential electors
University of New Mexico School of Law alumni
Women in Maryland politics
Candidates in the 2002 United States elections
21st-century American women politicians
United States Department of Labor officials